Clydesdale RFC are a South Lanarkshire rugby union club who compete in the  of the Scottish Rugby Union leagues. They are currently expanding their Senior and Junior rugby set-ups.

Formation

The rugby club was formed in 1977 as a rugby team of the HMRC Centre 1 in East Kilbride, South Lanarkshire.

Move to Hamilton

The club then moved to Hamilton, South Lanarkshire in 1980. It changed its name to Clydesdale RFC and played its home matches in Strathclyde Park. It joined Glasgow District in season 1981–82.

Move to Larkhall

Due to the Strathclyde Park redevelopment work in the 1990s the club relocated to Larkhall and played their home fixtures at Hareleeshill Sports Barn.

Move to Stonehouse

The club is now based in Stonehouse, South Lanarkshire. They play at the Alexander Hamilton Memorial Park.

Clydesdale Sevens

The club run the Clydesdale Sevens tournament.

Honours

Glasgow District Division 2.

Champions 1986–1987

The club went undefeated for a period of two years from October 1985 to October 1987.

BT West Division 4.

Champions 2008-2009

Runners-Up 2014-2015

Dumbarton Sevens

Winners: 1988

Committee
''As of 21 June 2021.

External links
Clydesdale RFC website

References

1977 establishments in Scotland
Rugby clubs established in 1977
Scottish rugby union teams
Rugby union in South Lanarkshire
Stonehouse, South Lanarkshire